Strmosten is a village situated in Despotovac municipality in Serbia.

Waterfall
Near the village Strmosten, located on the Resava River there is waterfall  Lisine  or  Veliki Buk, standing 25 meters high, Lisine is one of the highest waterfalls in Serbia.

Populated places in Pomoravlje District